The Glen Oak Hotel is a historic hotel building located at Hurlock, Dorchester County, Maryland, United States. It is a three-story frame building constructed about 1890. A two-story porch with Tuscan columns spans the south facade. The hotel was one of the first buildings constructed in the town, and functioned as a commercial and social center, serving salesmen who traveled by rail.

The Glen Oak Hotel was listed on the National Register of Historic Places in 1983.

References

External links
, including undated photo, at Maryland Historical Trust

Hotel buildings on the National Register of Historic Places in Maryland
Buildings and structures in Dorchester County, Maryland
Hotels in Maryland
Hotel buildings completed in 1890
National Register of Historic Places in Dorchester County, Maryland